Grand Funk Hits is a greatest hits compilation by Grand Funk Railroad originally released in 1976 on Capitol Records (LP-ST-11579). It peaked at number 126 on the Billboard 200.

The songs included on the album were all recorded after the band parted ways with manager Terry Knight in 1972. Grand Funk added keyboardist Craig Frost to its lineup later that year and moved away from a power trio to a lighter and more commercial sound. A compilation album of earlier songs, entitled Mark, Don & Mel: 1969–71, had been released in 1972.

Track listing 
"Rock 'N Roll Soul" (Mark Farner) - 3:28
"We're an American Band" (Don Brewer) * - 3:23
"Walk Like a Man" (Mark Farner/Don Brewer) * - 3:22
"Bad Time"  (Mark Farner) # - 2:54
"Some Kind of Wonderful" (John Ellison) # - 3:48
"The Loco-Motion" (Gerry Goffin/Carole King) * - 2:44
"Shinin' On" (Mark Farner/Don Brewer) * - 3:24
"Sally" (Mark Farner) # - 3:12
"Take Me" (Don Brewer/Craig Frost) # - 4:04
"To Get Back In" (Mark Farner) * - 3:53

 Produced by Grand Funk
 Produced by Todd Rundgren *
 Produced by Jimmy Ienner #

Personnel 
 Mark Farner – lead vocals & guitars
 Craig Frost – keyboards & background vocals
 Mel Schacher – bass & background vocals
 Don Brewer – lead vocals, drums & percussion

References 

1976 greatest hits albums
Grand Funk Railroad compilation albums
Capitol Records compilation albums